Vinod Kumar may refer to:
Vinod Kumar, born 1963, Indian actor from Mangalore
Vinod Kumar (wrestler), born 1965, Indian Olympic wrestler
Vinod Kumar (cricketer), born 1987, Indian cricketer
Vinod Kumar (athlete), born 1980, Indian para-athlete
B. Vinod Kumar, born 1959, Indian politician
Vinod Kumar Duggal, born 1944, Indian civil servant